This article contains the discography of Japanese pop singer Nana Kitade and includes information relating to album and single releases.

Albums

Studio albums

Compilation albums

EPs

Singles

Guest contributions
 Cover of "She Bop" on We Love Cyndi - Tribute to Cyndi Lauper (2008)

References

External links 

 Loveless Official Website
 Nana Kitade Official Web Site

Discographies of Japanese artists
Pop music discographies